Nachtmanderscheid is a village in the commune of Putscheid, Luxembourg.

Putscheid
Villages in Luxembourg